Claudio Iván González Landeros (born 26 April 1990) is a Chilean footballer who plays as a goalkeeper for Chilean Primera División side Everton.

Honours
Deportes Linares
 Tercera B: 

Unión La Calera
 Primera B: 2017 Transición

References
 
 

1990 births
Living people
People from Curicó
Chilean footballers
Association football goalkeepers
Curicó Unido footballers
Deportes Linares footballers
San Antonio Unido footballers
Unión San Felipe footballers
Everton de Viña del Mar footballers
Deportes Copiapó footballers
Unión La Calera footballers
Cobreloa footballers
Puerto Montt footballers
Deportes Temuco footballers
Tercera División de Chile players
Segunda División Profesional de Chile players
Primera B de Chile players
Chilean Primera División players